Under Two Flags may refer to:
Under Two Flags (novel), a novel by British writer Ouida, and its film adaptations:
Under Two Flags (1912 George Nichols film), a short directed by George Nichols
Under Two Flags (1912 Lucius Henderson film), a short directed by Lucius J. Henderson
Under Two Flags (1915 film), a short starring Helen Bray
Under Two Flags (1916 film), starring Theda Bara
Under Two Flags (1922 film), directed by Tod Browning
Under Two Flags (1936 film), featuring Ronald Colman, Claudette Colbert, Victor McLaglen and Rosalind Russell